Guy André (born November 17, 1959) is a Canadian politician who was elected to the House of Commons from the riding of Berthier—Maskinongé from 2004 to 2011. He is a member of the Bloc Québécois.

A social worker who lives in Pointe-du-Lac, a former city which is now a borough of Trois-Rivières, André was first elected to Parliament in the 2004 federal election. He was reelected without serious difficulty until he was defeated by NDP challenger Ruth Ellen Brosseau in the unexpected "orange wave" that swept through Quebec in the 2011 federal election. André had never received less than 45 percent of the vote, but was held to only 29.4 percent in 2011.

He was considered a member of the "pur et dur" (hardline) faction of the Quebec sovereignty movement.

Election results

References

External links 
 How'd They Vote?: Guy André's voting history and quotes

1959 births
Bloc Québécois MPs
Living people
Members of the House of Commons of Canada from Quebec
Politicians from Montreal
21st-century Canadian politicians